In Return may refer to:

 In Return (Odesza album), released in 2014
 In Return (Torche album), released in 2007
 In Return: Just a Book, a 2016 Indian documentary